The George Washington and Jefferson National Forests is an administrative entity combining two U.S. National Forests into one of the largest areas of public land in the Eastern United States. The forests cover  of land in the Appalachian Mountains of Virginia, West Virginia, and Kentucky.  Approximately  of the forest are remote and undeveloped and  have been designated as wilderness areas, which prohibits future development.

History
George Washington National Forest was established on May 16, 1918, as the Shenandoah National Forest.  The forest was renamed after the first President on June 28, 1932.  Natural Bridge National Forest was added on July 22, 1933.

Jefferson National Forest was formed on April 21, 1936, by combining portions of the Unaka and George Washington National Forests with other land.  In 1995, the George Washington and Jefferson National Forests were administratively combined.  The border between the two forests roughly follows the James River.  The combined forest is administered from its headquarters in Roanoke, Virginia.

Notable features
 The northern portion of the Blue Ridge Parkway, which is separately administered by the National Park Service, runs through the Forest.
 Over 2,000 miles (3,000 km) of hiking trails, including segments of the Appalachian Trail, go through the forest.
 Virginia's highest point, Mount Rogers, is located in the Mount Rogers National Recreation Area that is part of the forest. Other notable mountains include Elliott Knob, which has one of the last remaining fire lookout towers in the eastern U.S., and Whitetop Mountain.
 Approximately  of old-growth forests.
 The ghost town of Lignite, Virginia, lies within the forest.
 The deepest gorge east of the Mississippi River, Breaks Interstate Park, is located in the forest.
 Roaring Run Furnace is the only site on the National Register of Historic Places owned by the Jefferson National Forest.

Flora and fauna

The Forests' vast and mountainous terrain harbors a great variety of plant life—over 50 species of trees and over 2,000 species of shrubs and herbaceous plants.

Locations of old growth include Peters Mountain, Mount Pleasant National Scenic Area, Rich Hole Wilderness, Flannery Ridge, Pick Breeches Ridge, and Laurel Fork Gorge, Pickem Mountain, and Mount Rogers National Recreation Area. The Ramsey's Draft and Kimberling Creek Wildernesses in particular are mostly old-growth.

The black bear is relatively common, enough so that there is a short hunting season to prevent overpopulation. White-tailed deer, bobcat, bald eagles, weasel, otter, and marten are also known to inhabit the Forests.

Activities
The forests are popular hiking, mountain biking, and hunting destinations. The Appalachian Trail extends for 330 miles (530 km) from the southern end of Shenandoah National Park through the forest and along the Blue Ridge Parkway. The forest is within a two-hour drive for over ten million people and thus receives large numbers of visitors, especially in the region closest to Shenandoah National Park.

The George Washington National Forest is a popular destination for trail runners.  It is the location for several Ultramarathons, including the Massanutten Mountain Trails 100 miler, the Old Dominion 100 miler, and the Old Dominion Memorial 100 miler.

George Washington Forest is also the venue for Nature Camp, a natural science education-oriented summer camp for youth. The camp is located on national forest land near the town of Vesuvius, Virginia. 
It has operated at this location since the summer of 1953.

Counties
Jefferson National Forest is located in 22 separate counties, more than any other National Forest except Mark Twain National Forest in Missouri, which lies in 29 counties. Botetourt, Monroe, and Rockbridge counties, at the dividing line between the two forests, include parts of both forests. Thirdly, note that the state of Kentucky actually has very little area, with its two counties bringing up the tail end of Jefferson National Forest.

Ranger District Offices

Ranger offices are the Forest Service's public service offices.  Maps and other information about the forests can be obtained at these locations.  These offices are open Monday through Friday from 8:00 a.m. to 4:30 p.m.  The Supervisor's Office in Roanoke is not located in the forest and is primarily an administrative location.

District offices are listed from north to south.  Counties are in Virginia unless otherwise indicated.

Wilderness areas
All are in the state of Virginia, except as indicated. There are 17 wildernesses in Jefferson National Forest, second only to Tongass National Forest, which has 19.

George Washington National Forest

 Barbours Creek Wilderness (part)
 Priest Wilderness
 Ramseys Draft Wilderness
 Rich Hole Wilderness
 Rough Mountain Wilderness
 Saint Mary's Wilderness
 Shawvers Run Wilderness (part)
 Three Ridges Wilderness

Jefferson National Forest

 Barbours Creek Wilderness (most)
 Beartown Wilderness
 Brush Mountain East Wilderness
 Brush Mountain Wilderness
 Garden Mountain Wilderness
 Hunting Camp Creek Wilderness
 James River Face Wilderness
 Kimberling Creek Wilderness
 Lewis Fork Wilderness
 Little Dry Run Wilderness
 Little Wilson Creek Wilderness
 Mountain Lake Wilderness (Virginia / West Virginia)
 Peters Mountain Wilderness
 Raccoon Branch Wilderness
 Shawvers Run Wilderness (most)
 Stone Mountain Wilderness
 Thunder Ridge Wilderness

Wilderness Society's “Mountain Treasures” in the Jefferson Forest
In 1999 the Wilderness Society conducted a review of lands in the Jefferson National Forest to look for large, intact areas that satisfy a need for backcountry recreation, ecological study, biodiversity, and the preservation of cultural history from early America.  The report found 67 such areas and identified them as  “Mountain Treasures”. In 2012 The New River Group of the Sierra Club commissioned a study to review the status of these areas.   Some of the areas had been converted into Wilderness Areas, while others had not received any special protection.  Areas in close proximity were grouped with nearby wilderness areas into eleven clusters.  The clusters, from north to south, are:

Glenwood Cluster
Craig Creek Cluster
Barbours Creek-Shawvers Run Cluster
Sinking Creek Valley Cluster
Mountain Lake Wilderness Cluster
Angels Rest Cluster
Walker Mountain Cluster
Kimberling Creek Cluster
Garden Mountain Cluster
Mount Rogers Cluster 
Clinch Ranger District Cluster

History
The first camp of the Civilian Conservation Corps NF-1, Camp Roosevelt, was established in the George Washington National Forest near Luray, Virginia. It is now the site of the Camp Roosevelt Recreation Area.

Mountain Valley Pipeline protests 
In 2018–2019, protests occurred near Peters Mountain to block the Mountain Valley Pipeline. The 303-mile pipeline would transport natural gas through the  Jefferson National Forest and cross the Appalachian Trail.

See also
 Great North Mountain
 Massanutten Mountain
 Shenandoah Mountain
 Monongahela National Forest—adjoining forest in West Virginia

References

Bibliography

 
 Jefferson National Forest: An Appalachian Environmental History. Knoxville: University of Tennessee Pr., 2011.
 Prehistoric Southwest Virginia: Aboriginal Occupation, Land Use, and Environmental Worldview, Smithfield Review 5 (April 2000): 125–151.
 Turnpike Tourism in Western Virginia, Virginia Cavalcade 48:1 (Winter 1998): 14–23.
 The Potts Valley Branch Railroad and Tri-State Incline Lumber Operation in West Virginia and Virginia, 1892–1932, West Virginia History 54 (1995): 42–58.
 The Mount Rogers National Recreation Area and the Rise of Public Involvement in Forest Service Planning, Environmental History Review 28 (Summer 1994): 41–65.
 An Appalachian Forest: Creation of the Jefferson National Forest and its effects on the local community, Forest and Conservation History 37:4 (October 1993): 169–178.
 The Great Anti-Fire Campaign, American Forests, 99:5&6 (May/June 1993): 33–35, 58.
 Green Cove Station: An Appalachian train depot and its community, Virginia Cavalcade, 42:2 (Autumn 1992): 52–61.
 Fisheries and Wildlife Management: part of the history of the Jefferson National Forest, Virginia Forests, 48:2 (Summer 1992): 6–8.

External links

 George Washington and Jefferson National Forests
 U.S. Forest Service, George Washington National Forest, Dry River District Collection at James Madison University's Special Collections. 
  George Washington and Jefferson National Forests, Revised Forest Plans

 
National Forests of Kentucky
National Forests of Virginia
National Forests of West Virginia
National Forests of the Appalachians
Appalachian Mountains
Blue Ridge Mountains
James River (Virginia)
Shenandoah River
Protected areas of Alleghany County, Virginia
Protected areas of Amherst County, Virginia
Protected areas of Augusta County, Virginia
Protected areas of Bath County, Virginia
Protected areas of Bedford County, Virginia
Protected areas of Bland County, Virginia
Protected areas of Botetourt County, Virginia
Protected areas of Carroll County, Virginia
Protected areas of Craig County, Virginia
Protected areas of Dickenson County, Virginia
Protected areas of Frederick County, Virginia
Protected areas of Giles County, Virginia
Protected areas of Grayson County, Virginia
Protected areas of Hampshire County, West Virginia
Protected areas of Hardy County, West Virginia
Protected areas of Highland County, Virginia
Protected areas of Lee County, Virginia
Protected areas of Letcher County, Kentucky
Protected areas of Monroe County, West Virginia
Protected areas of Montgomery County, Virginia
Protected areas of Nelson County, Virginia
Protected areas of Page County, Virginia
Protected areas of Pendleton County, West Virginia
Protected areas of Pike County, Kentucky
Protected areas of Pulaski County, Virginia
Protected areas of Roanoke County, Virginia
Protected areas of Rockbridge County, Virginia
Protected areas of Rockingham County, Virginia
Protected areas of Scott County, Virginia
Protected areas of Shenandoah County, Virginia
Protected areas of Smyth County, Virginia
Protected areas of Tazewell County, Virginia
Protected areas of Warren County, Virginia
Protected areas of Washington County, Virginia
Protected areas of Wise County, Virginia
Protected areas of Wythe County, Virginia
Protected areas established in 1918
Protected areas established in 1936
1918 establishments in the United States
1936 establishments in the United States
Southwest Virginia
Transboundary protected areas
Western Virginia